Rebecca Grote (born 6 August 1992) is a German field hockey player, who plays as a midfielder.

Career

Club Hockey
Grote currently plays her club hockey for Rot-Weiss Köln. During the 2017–18 season however, Grote relocated to Spain to play for Club de Campo in Madrid.

National Teams

Junior
In 2013, Grote was captain of the Germany U–21 side at the Junior World Cup in Mönchengladbach, Germany. Germany ultimately finished in tenth place, their worst performance at the tournament to date.

Senior
Grote made her senior International debut in 2019, during the inaugural FIH Pro League. Throughout the tournament, Grote scored 5 goals for the team, on the way to a bronze medal finish.

Following her performance in the FIH Pro League, Germany head coach Xavier Reckinger named Grote in the final squad for the 2019 EuroHockey Nations Championship in Antwerp, Belgium.

International Goals

References

External links
 
 

1992 births
Living people
German female field hockey players